Liu Fei (born 18 January 1994) is a Chinese table tennis player. Her highest career ITTF ranking was 23.

References

1994 births
Living people
Chinese female table tennis players